Moneypenny Creek is a tributary of the Susquehanna River in Wyoming County, Pennsylvania, in the United States. The creek has one named tributary, which is known as Thurston Hollow. Moneypenny Creek has experienced flash flooding. The surficial geology in its vicinity consists of Wisconsinan Till, bedrock, alluvium, and Wisconsinan Ice-Contact Stratified Drift. The creek's watershed is a Coldwater Fishery and a Migratory Fishery.

Course

Moneypenny Creek begins on Miller Mountain in Eaton Township, Wyoming County. It flows east for a few tenths of a mile before turning southeast and flowing through a valley. After several tenths of a mile, the creek turns northeast and receives the tributary Thurston Hollow from the right. It then turns east for several tenths of a mile and its valley becomes shallower before it reaches its confluence with the Susquehanna River.

Moneypenny Creek joins the Susquehanna River  upriver of its mouth.

Tributaries
Moneypenny Creek has one named tributary, which is known as Thurston Hollow.

Geography and geology

The surficial geology along the lowest reaches of Moneypenny Creek mainly consists of alluvium, although Wisconsinan Ice-Contact Stratified Drift, Wisconsinan Till, and bedrock occur nearby. Slightly further upstream, the surficial geology mainly consists of alluvium and bedrock. In the upper reaches of the creek, the surficial geology is almost entirely Wisconsinan Till, but there is some bedrock.

A channel restoration project for a reach of Moneypenny Creek has been proposed.

Watershed
The creek is entirely within the United States Geological Survey quadrangle of Center Moreland.

Such a project would impact  of Moneypenny Creek, as well as some of its tributaries.

History
Moneypenny Creek was entered into the Geographic Names Information System on August 2, 1979. Its identifier in the Geographic Names Information System is 1199179.

On May 12, 2004, a virtually stationary thunderstorm appeared over Miller Mountain and Shaver Mountain, causing serious flash flooding on Moneypenny Creek. A warning issued by National Weather Service Binghamton, New York approximately one hour before the storm specifically mentioned that areas near Moneypenny Creek (and several other areas) were at risk.

A bridge over Moneypenny Creek in Eaton Township is eligible for replacement, as of 2014.

Biology
The drainage basin of Moneypenny Creek is designated as a Coldwater Fishery and a Migratory Fishery.

See also
Martin Creek (Susquehanna River), next tributary of the Susquehanna River going downriver
Mill Run (Susquehanna River), next tributary of the Susquehanna River going downriver
List of rivers of Pennsylvania

References

Rivers of Wyoming County, Pennsylvania
Tributaries of the Susquehanna River
Rivers of Pennsylvania